D17, or similar, may refer to:

Vehicles

Aircraft
 Akaflieg Darmstadt D-17 Darmstadt, a German sailplane
 Beechcraft D17S Staggerwing, an American biplane
 Fokker D.XVII, a Dutch biplane

Ships 
 , a Cannon-class destroyer escort of the Brazilian Navy
 , a Battle-class destroyer of the Royal Navy
 , a Q-class destroyer of the Royal Navy
 , a U-class destroyer of the Royal Navy

Surface vehicles 
 Allis-Chalmers D17, an American tractor
 LNER Class D17, an English 4-4-0 steam locomotive class
 Queensland D17 class locomotive, an Australian 4-6-4T steam locomotive

Other uses 
 D17 (TV channel), a French digital television channel, now CStar
 D-17B, an early computer used in missile guidance systems
 Dublin 17, a postal district in Ireland
 Lipoma, a benign tumor of adipose tissue
 D17 series of Honda D engines